N2 Stadium or Aurangabad District Cricket Association Ground or City and Industrial Development Corporation Stadium is cricket stadium in city of CIDCO, Aurangabad, Maharashtra. The ground has hosted domestic and couple of womens' international cricket matches.  As of 3 March 2023 two Duleep trophy and two Ranji trophy matches held here. 

In 2003, a New Zealand women versus India women ODI happened here. The match was won by India women's by 9 wickets with Indian opener Jaya Sharma scoring 96.

In 2012, Aurangabad District Cricket Association decided to redevelop the stadium into 20,000 to 25,000 seater stadium with boundaries of 63 metres and floodlights as well. Also redevelopment of VIP Box, Press Box, Parking, Gym, Restaurant, Shopping center etc.

First-Class Matches Hosted

Women's ODI Hosted

References

External links
Cricinfo profile
Cricketarchive.com

Sports venues in Maharashtra
Buildings and structures in Aurangabad, Maharashtra
Cricket grounds in Maharashtra
Multi-purpose stadiums in India
Sport in Aurangabad, Maharashtra
1988 establishments in Maharashtra
Sports venues completed in 1998
20th-century architecture in India